Grazielodendron riodocensis is a species of flowering plant in the legume family, Fabaceae. It belongs to the subfamily Faboideae, and was recently assigned to the informal monophyletic Pterocarpus clade within the Dalbergieae. It is the only member of the genus Grazielodendron. It is only found in Brazil.

The genus name of Grazielodendron is in honour of Graziela Maciel Barroso (1912–2003), a Brazilian botanist, and also "'dendron" (δένδρον) which is the Greek word for "tree". The Latin specific epithet of  riodocensis refers Rio Doce or Doce River in Brazil.
Grazielodendron riodocensis was first described and published in Bradea Vol.3 on page 401 in 1983.

References

Dalbergieae
Plants described in 1983
Flora of Brazil
Monotypic Fabaceae genera